The Rhodesian honours system was established at the time that Rhodesia unilaterally declared itself a republic in March 1970, when a system of military and civil decorations and awards was instituted by Presidential Warrant in November 1970.

Prior to 2 March 1970, Rhodesians were conferred awards in the British Honours System.

List of honours

The list of Rhodesian honours and decorations, in order of precedence, is as follows:

The Grand Cross of Valour (G.C.V.)	
The Conspicuous Gallantry Decoration (C.G.D.)	
The Grand Commander of the Legion of Merit (G.C.L.M.)	
The Grand Officer of the Legion of Merit (G.L.M.)	
The Independence Decoration (I.D.)	
The Independence Commemorative Decoration (I.C.D.)	
Commander of the Legion of Merit (C.L.M.)	
Police Cross for Conspicuous Gallantry (P.C.G.)	
The Silver Cross of Rhodesia (S.C.R.)	
Prison Cross for Gallantry (R.P.C.)	
Officer of the Legion of Merit (O.L.M.)	
The Member of the Legion of Merit (M.L.M.)	
The Police Decoration for Gallantry (P.D.G.)	
The Bronze Cross of Rhodesia (B.C.R.)	
The Police Cross for Distinguished Service (P.C.D.)	
The Defence Cross for Distinguished Service (D.C.D.)	
The Rhodesia Prison Cross for Distinguished Service (P.S.C.)	
The Meritorious Conduct Medal (M.C.M.)	
The Rhodesia Prison Medal for Gallantry (R.P.M.)	
The Medal for Meritorious Service (M.S.M.)	
The Police Medal for Meritorious Service (P.M.M.)	
The Defence Forces' Medal for Meritorious Service (D.M.M.)	
The Rhodesia Prison Medal for Meritorious Service (P.M.S.)	
The President's Medal for Chiefs	
The President's Medal for Headmen	
The Military Forces' Commendation
The Director’s Commendation (Prisons)	
The Police Long Service Medal (Rhodesia)	
The Exemplary Service Medal	
The Prison Long Service Medal (Rhodesia)	
Police Reserve Long Service Medal (Rhodesia)	
The Medal for Territorial or Reserve Service	
Fire Brigade Long Service and Good Conduct Medal (Rhodesia)
The Rhodesia Badge of Honour	
The President’s Medal for Shooting (Pres MS)

In addition, the General Service Medal was awarded for military and police service; the Prison General Service Medal for prison service, and the Rhodesian District Service Medal for the Department of Internal Affairs (INTAF).

Details and recipients

Around 12,000 awards were given out between 1970 and 1981. The last Rhodesian gallantry awards were awarded in June 1980, three months after Zimbabwe's independence. However, Rhodesian long-service decorations continued to be given to police officers and service personnel until June 1982.

The most highly decorated soldier in the Rhodesian Army was Major Grahame Wilson, second-in-command of the Rhodesian SAS, who was awarded the Grand Cross of Valour, Silver Cross of Rhodesia and Bronze Cross of Rhodesia.

See also

Zimbabwean honours system

References

Pittaway, J, and Fourie, C., 2003. SAS Rhodesia, Dandy Agencies, South Africa. 
Saffery, D., 2006. The Rhodesia Medal Roll, Jeppestown Press, United Kingdom. 
Rhodesian Militaria: Medals - Detailed photos & descriptions of genuine Rhodesian military medals.

 
Colonial orders of chivalry
Orders, decorations, and medals of the British Empire
Rhodesia